Wahweap is a populated place situated in Coconino County, Arizona, United States, right along the border with Utah.

Transportation
Express offers bus service between Wahweap and Page, Arizona.

Climate
Wahweap is located near the south end of Lake Powell.

References

Populated places in Coconino County, Arizona